Governor Francisco Gabrielli International Airport , better known as El Plumerillo International Airport, is located  northeast of the centre of Mendoza, capital of the Mendoza Province of Argentina. It is operated by Aeropuertos Argentina 2000

The 4th Air Brigade (El Plumerillo Military Air Base) is located on the southern section of the airport.

Airlines and destinations

Statistics

Accidents and incidents
20 January 1944: A LanChile Lodestar 18–50, registration CC-CLC-0072, was due to operate a Mendoza–San Juan cargo service when it crashed on takeoff, killing all 12 occupants aboard.

See also
Transport in Argentina
List of airports in Argentina

References

External links
Mendoza Airport Aeropuertos Argentina 2000

Airports in Argentina
Airports in Mendoza Province
Buildings and structures in Mendoza, Argentina
Buildings and structures in Mendoza Province